Jaakko Rafael Kailajärvi (born 1 July 1941) is a retired Finnish weightlifter who set two light-heavyweight world records in the snatch in 1962. He placed second-third in this event at the 1972 and 1974 world championships. Kailajärvi competed in light-heavyweight and middle-heavyweight divisions at the 1964, 1968, 1972 and 1976 Olympics with the best result of fifth place in 1968. His elder brother Jouni was also an Olympic weightlifter.

References

1941 births
Living people
Olympic weightlifters of Finland
Weightlifters at the 1964 Summer Olympics
Weightlifters at the 1968 Summer Olympics
Weightlifters at the 1972 Summer Olympics
Weightlifters at the 1976 Summer Olympics
Sportspeople from Tampere
21st-century Finnish people
20th-century Finnish people